Wooburn Green is a village in the civil parish of Wooburn, Buckinghamshire, England.

Location
Wooburn Green is a village situated four miles south east of the town of High Wycombe. It neighbours Beaconsfield, Loudwater, Flackwell Heath, Wooburn Common and Bourne End. It is close to the M40 motorway, meaning London and Birmingham are easily accessible by road.

The village was once served by the High Wycombe to Bourne End railway line, however the line and station closed in 1970.

The Green
The large village green (a conservation area) is fringed with trees and is surrounded by older cottages, small Victorian and Edwardian houses, modern shops and local businesses. A Village Fête and funfairs are held there regularly throughout the year. During the 1980s, the Green was used to host the Meadows School summer Fete. 

1st Wooburn Scout Group meets at their headquarters in Watery Lane, Wooburn Green. You can see the old site of the railway. There is a couple of housing estates which have been built on part of the old railway line.

References

External links

Villages in Buckinghamshire
Wycombe District